Argentino is the Spanish word for "citizen of Argentina" or the adjective "Argentine".

It may also refer to:
Geography
 Argentino, a seaside resort in Uruguay
 Lake Argentino, a lake in the Andes in Patagonia
Sports
 Argentino de Quilmes, an Argentine association futbol club
 Argentino de Rosario, an Argentine association futbol club
 Club Argentino de Rugby, an Argentine rugby union futbol club
Other
 Argentine argentino, a former Argentine currency